Bandy World Championship may refer to:

 Bandy World Championship
 Women's Bandy World Championship
 Youth Bandy World Championship